Georgina Leanse H. Escobar (born 1980) is a Mexican-American playwright, raised on the frontier in Juárez, with a strong sense of her dual nationality. Her plays explore themes of fantasy, mythology, witchcraft, feminism and the breakdown of the family. Escobar also conducts artistic youth workshops, directs musicals, as well as performing translation work.

Early life
Escobar was born in Ciudad Juárez, Chihuahua, México. Being raised in a city on the border of the United States and Mexico, with dual citizenship, Escobar has stated that the idea of "borders" did not hold much significance to her. She regularly traveled between the two countries without a second thought, mostly going to the United States side of the border with her mother for shopping. Despite growing up in a community in Mexico that Escobar describes as a "machismo community of cattle ranchers and mine owners", she says the respect for women and the power they held within her family dynamic was very strong. She has lived in many places throughout her life, including: Chihuahua City, Chihuahua, México; Zacatecas City, Zacatecas, México; San Diego, California; El Paso, Texas; and Albuquerque, New Mexico. She now lives in New York City.

Education and career
After graduating from the University of Texas at El Paso in 2006 with a degree in humanities and philosophy, Escobar began her career as a performer and studied acting at the Stella Adler Studio of Acting in New York City. However, a teacher at the school inadvertently inspired Escobar's eventual career shift to playwriting by encouraging her to try writing rather than acting. Escobar went on to receive an MFA in dramatic writing at the University of New Mexico, Albuquerque, in 2011.

She has been involved with the Latinx Theatre Commons throughout her career in multiple ways, from having a staged reading of her play Sweep at a festival in 2015 alongside the works of other Latinx playwrights, to serving as the managing editor for an online publication for the LTC titled Café Onda, to acting as the steering committee member for the LTC from 2013 to the present. Aside from acting, writing, and editing, Escobar has also worked as an educator and translator. She also does community-based youth outreach in the form of artistic workshops with grade school students. Most recently, in April 2017, she participated in a playwriting workshop with students from a school district in Marfa, Texas, a small community in West Texas not far from her birthplace in Ciudad Juárez, México.

Works

Themes and inspiration
Escobar's works include themes of fantasy, surrealism, feminism, family relationships, and modern twists on traditional mythology, among others. She notes that her female family members served as inspiration for many of the strong female characters in her plays, especially because of the fantastical discussions she often engaged in with the women of her family. She cites ancient philosophers as well as writers such as Jorge Luis Borges, Shel Silverstein, Lewis Caroll, Kurt Vonnegut, Christopher Moore, and Neil Gaiman as inspirational figures.

Notable works

StoneHeart
StoneHeart is a deconstructed western that explores the parallel deterioration of a family and a society in Ciudad Juarez, Chihuahua in the 1980s. Forbidden love, mental illness and suicide come together in a visceral horror family drama where the Zermanis are forced to cope with the death of their legacy amidst the rise of a new generation of 'society's finest.' Listen in the 2019 Kilroy's List

Then they forgot about The Rest
Two sisters coping with a recent traumatic event sign up to receive information regarding a special trial for the soon-to-hit-market drug: Alleviate. Meanwhile, at an ad agency called The Rest, the advertisers are about to accept this new 'forgetting pill' brief. Paths intertwine between memory, the truth, and The Rest as a pending apocalypse threatens to end the human race. An apocalyptic frontera (border) funk piece with elements of noir, 'Then they forgot about The Rest' is a southwest femmetasia about the things worth forgetting, the physical impact of memory, and the company that we keep." http://www.playbill.com/article/watch-how-the-sound-of-a-fridge-became-the-soundtrack-to-georgina-escobars-new-play-then-they-forgot-about-the-rest

Ash Tree
Ash Tree follows the story of three sisters in the aftermath of the loss of their mother. Escobar experienced the loss of her own mother before the idea for the play came to her in a dream. The plot has its basis in themes relating to fantasy and mythology. The play had its initial readings in Indiana in 2010, the ASSITEJ Festival of Denmark and Sweden in 2010, and the Kahootz Theatre in 2009. In 2011, it was workshopped by Fourth Wall Productions, a company that Escobar founded in 2003. Ash Tree premiered in New Mexico's Duke City Repertory Theatre in 2012 and was produced by Capital High School Theatre in Santa Fe, New Mexico, in 2016.

The Ruin
The Ruin explores themes of magic, witchcraft, mystery and ancient legends. Like Ash Tree, Escobar claims she was inspired to write the story after the idea came to her in a dream. It was put on in 2011 by the Manhattan Repertory Theatre and in the Words Afire Theatre Festival in New Mexico.

The Unbearable Likeness of Jo, Semity, & Jones
The Unbearable Likeness of Jo, Semity, & Jones is a "A ridiculous investigation into memory, personal identity, and digiphrenia. Moments before her plane is about to crash, Jones deconstructs memory as a state of passage; from love, to Facebook, to her sexuality; all as related to one thing: present shock." The play was read at Coffee and Whiskey Productions in Chicago, IL, in 2014, at The Flea Theater in New York City in 2015, and at The Movement Theatre Company in New York City in 2016. The play had a workshop production at Dixon Place in 2015.

Sweep
Sweep is described as a feminist play. The story follows two siblings who have the ability to travel through time. Much of the story has to do with biblical figures such as Adam and Eve, which Escobar attributes in part to her upbringing. She attended Catholic school and explored spirituality alongside her family members. Sweep is a femme spec-evo story that follows two sisters and hit women of the splintered worlds whose initial snafu with Adam and Eve catches up with them lifetimes later. Fighting for the final chance to reset humanity's imperfect patterns, the women of Sweep hunt their targets from biblical times to modern-day in order to accelerate humanity's evolution.

Sweep had readings at the Brooklyn Generator in New York City in 2014 and at the Latinx Theatre Commons Carnaval of New Latina/o Work in Chicago in 2015. It was also workshopped at the Lincoln Center Theater's Director's Lab in 2016. The play was a finalist for the National Latino Playwriting Award. It was produced in 2017 at the Aurora Theater in Atlanta, Georgia. The casting of the two main characters for the play is flexible, with no preference given to any particular ethnicity or gender identity for the actors. The Aurora Theater production of the play cast two black women for the roles of the main characters, and Escobar expressed support for this casting decision.

The Circuz
The Circuz is a political satire and melodrama. Set in Ciudad Juarez at the height of genocide and murder, the narrative was "macabre farce that explores the discomfort of violence through exaggeration, faith through senses, and the cynicism of a land divided in two".

Selected list of works
 Penny Pinball Presents: The Beacons 
 Species:Human
 Monsters We Create (in collaboration with UTEP Playwrights)
 Screwgar
 Quixote: On the Conquest of Self (translation)
 All Strings Considered 
 Albrijes
 El Muerto Vagabundo 
 Sweep
 The Unbearable Likeness of Jones 
 The Wayfoot Series 
 Firerock The Musical 
 Ash Tree
 The Ruin

Awards
Escobar received the Kennedy Center's Theatre for Young Audiences Playwriting Award in 2010.

Personal life
Escobar has been open about her sexuality and identifies as a "gay Mexicana". Spanish is her first language, and she states that her "true self lives" in the writing of her native language. Besides writing, Escobar has expressed her love for the outdoors and for the visual arts, saying that she often paints.

When it comes to her identity as a Latina playwright, Escobar pushes back against the idea that Latinx playwrights must have some specifically Latinx quality to their work, stating: "As an artist and writer, all of my work was, is and will always be Mexican because that is what I am... Personally, I am more interested in being an artist than in defining my art." She rejects the fact that Latinx playwrights are pressured to include Spanglish or concrete depictions of their heritage and culture within their plays. Escobar also criticizes the lack of opportunities for Spanish-language theater in the U.S. Latinx theater world and refuses to condone writers who solely focus on and glorify Mexico's cartel violence.

Notes

 

Living people
University of Texas at El Paso alumni
University of New Mexico alumni
American women dramatists and playwrights
Mexican emigrants to the United States
American LGBT dramatists and playwrights
People from Ciudad Juárez
21st-century American women
1980 births